The Spanish Athletics Championships is an annual outdoor track and field competition organised by the Royal Spanish Athletics Federation (RFEA), which serves as the Spanish national championship for the sport. It is typically held as a two-day event in the Spanish summer around late June to early August. The venue of the championships is decided on an annual basis.

The competition was first held in 1917 as a men's only competition. A separate women's began in 1931 but, following the onset of the Spanish Civil War, this was cancelled after 1935 and it was not until 1963 that women events were added alongside the men's programme. This made Spain the last large European country to provide a national championship for women in the sport and female participation in sport in general in Spain was low due to a lack of physical education, facilities and funding for women's sport. This stemmed from the policy of National Catholicism, which saw women's place as caregivers and physical feats by them as a challenge to morality.

The championships has been held every years since its inauguration with the exception of 1922 and three years during the civil war (1937, 1938, and 1939). The modern event is used for the Spanish international selection for major athletics events, including the Olympic Games, World Championships in Athletics and European Athletics Championships.

Events
On the current programme a total of 38 individual Spanish Championship athletics events are contested, divided evenly between men and women. For each of the sexes, there are six track running events, three obstacle events, four jumps, four throws, and two relays.

Track running
100 metres, 200 metres, 400 metres, 800 metres, 1500 metres, 5000 metres
Obstacle events
100 metres hurdles (women only), 110 metres hurdles (men only), 400 metres hurdles, 3000 metres steeplechase
Jumping events
Pole vault, high jump, long jump, triple jump
Throwing events
Shot put, discus throw, javelin throw, hammer throw
Relays
4 × 100 metres relay, 4 × 400 metres relay

A men's barra vasca competition was held up to 1963 – the event being a variation of the javelin throw, but the spear was thrown by a technique of spinning while holding it at the hip. This was banned to preserve public safety, as a result of errant throws.

In spite of the prevention of women for competing at the national championships for such a long period, the women's programme subsequently expanded in line with international developments. The first addition was a women's pentathlon in 1965 (later being replaced by the heptathlon in 1981). A women's 1500 m was added in 1969, a 3000 metres in 1974 (held until 1994), a 5000 m in 1982, then a 10,000 m in 1984. The women's 80 metres hurdles was extended to the 100 m distance in 1969 and the 400 m hurdles emerged in 1977. A women's 5000 m track walk was first featured in 1982 and extended to the full 10,000 m distance in 1990. The field events programme expanded in the 1990s, with the addition of the triple jump in 1990, pole vault in 1994, and hammer throw in 1995. Women finally achieved parity with men in the track and field programme with the addition of the steeplechase in 2001.

Spanish championships in 10K run, half marathon, marathon, 100 kilometres run, cross country running, mountain running and road walking are held separately from the main track and field championships. There is also a Spanish Athletics Club Championships for athletics clubs, which was first held in 1958 for men and 1966 for women.

Editions

Women-only

Men/unified championships

Championships records

Men

Women

See also
List of Spanish records in athletics

References

 

 
Athletics competitions in Spain
National athletics competitions
Recurring sporting events established in 1917
1917 establishments in Spain
Athletics